The Peter Doherty Institute for Infection and Immunity is a research institute located in Melbourne, Australia. The Doherty Institute is named after the name of Laureate Professor Peter C. Doherty (Nobel prize winner in 1996). This institute is a joint venture between The University of Melbourne and The Royal Melbourne Hospital.

COVID-19 response

Modelling Report for National Cabinet 
Doherty Institute has advised the Australian government for the transition to nation reopening based upon the vaccination progress in the modelling report. This 4-phase transition plan depends upon the percentage (70%/*80%) of the fully vaccinated eligible population(16 years or older). In February 2022, the Doherty Institute advised against periodic six-month boosters.

References

External links

Medical research institutes in Melbourne
University of Melbourne